The 1955 Small Club World Cup was the fourth edition of the Small Club World Cup, a tournament held in Venezuela between 1952 and 1957, and in 1963 and in 1965. It was played by four participants, half from Europe and half from South America in double round robin format and featured players like Mario Coluna, José Águas, goalkeeper Costa Pereira for Benfica, Dino Sani, Nílton de Sordi for Sao Paulo, Dutch Faas Wilkes and Pasieguito for Valencia.

As Milan and Real Madrid declined to participate, they were replaced by Spanish club Valencia and local team La Salle. On the other hand, Brazilian club São Paulo's participation was part of a tour that also included Colombia and Mexico, while Valencia became the third Spanish team to visit Venezuela, after Real Madrid and Barcelona.

The tournament was organised by Spanish entrepreneurs Damián Gaubeka and Pedro Reyes, and named "Copa General de Brigada Marcos Pérez Jiménez" by the press, which never mentioned it as "Pequeña Copa del Mundo". Argentine striker Rubén Padín of La Salle (who had been loaned from Cúcuta Deportivo to play this tournament exclusively) was the topscorer with 10 goals.

Participants

Matches

Final standings

Topscorers

Champion

References

1955–54
1955 in South American football
1955 in Brazilian football
1955–56 in Portuguese football
1955–56 in Spanish football
1955 in Venezuelan sport